Lovett is an unincorporated community in eastern Laurens County, Georgia, United States.  It is part of the Dublin Micropolitan Statistical Area.

History
Lovett had its start in 1884 when the railroad was extended to that point. The community was named after Warren P. Lovett, a railroad official.

The Georgia General Assembly incorporated Lovett as a town in 1889. The town's municipal charter was repealed in 1995.

References

Unincorporated communities in Laurens County, Georgia
Unincorporated communities in Georgia (U.S. state)
Dublin, Georgia micropolitan area